Katarzyna Ankudowicz (born 3 June 1981) is a Polish actress. She graduated from the Aleksander Zelwerowicz State Theatre Academy in 2004.

Filmography 
2004-2006: Bulionerzy
2004: Mało upalne lato
2005: Szaleńcy
2006-2007: Pogoda na piątek
2007: Mamuśki
since 2013: Pierwsza miłość
2013: Walesa: Man of Hope
2017: Gotowi na wszystko. Exterminator
2021: Friends

References

External links 
 

Polish actresses
Polish film actresses
1981 births
Living people
People from Morąg